de Gasparis is a lunar crater that is located in the southwest part of the Moon. It lies to the southeast of the crater Cavendish and south of Mersenius.

The rim of de Gasparis is worn and eroded, and the interior has been flooded by basaltic lava. The surviving outer rim reaches a maximum altitude of about 0.8 km.

This crater is notable for the formation of rilles that criss-cross the floor and the surrounding surface. This system of clefts in the surface is designated Rimae de Gasparis, and they span an area of about 130 kilometers in diameter. The rilles are thought to have been created due to tectonic faults deep below the surface. As they cut across de Gasparis, this indicates that they were formed after the crater.

Satellite craters
By convention these features are identified on lunar maps by placing the letter on the side of the crater midpoint that is closest to de Gasparis.

References

External links

Impact craters on the Moon